Rico Dene Thomas Rogers (born 25 April 1978, in Palmerston North) is a retired New Zealand cyclist who last rode for Attaque Team Gusto.

Palmares

2010 
1st Stages 4 & 6 Tour of China
2011
1st Stage 7 Tour de Taiwan
1st Stage 8 Tour of Qinghai Lake
1st Stage 1 Tour of China
2012
1st Grand Prix de la ville de Pérenchies
2013
1st Stage 1 Tour of Thailand
1st Stage 6 An Post Rás
1st Stage 6 Tour of China I
3rd Jurmala Grand Prix
4th Riga Grand Prix

References

1978 births
Living people
New Zealand male cyclists